Wouter olde Heuvel (born 18 August 1986) is a Dutch former speed skater who participated in international competitions. His older brother Remco is also a speed skater.

Records

Personal records

Olde Heuvel has a score of 148.281 points on the Adelskalendern.

World records

 * together with Ted-Jan Bloemen and Ralph de Haan
 ** together with Ted-Jan Bloemen and Boris Kusmirak

World records at a sea-level ice rink (non-official)

Tournament overview

Source:

World Cup overview

– = geen deelname
(b) = Division B
* = 10000 meter

Medals won

Career highlights

World Allround Championships
2006 - Calgary, 15th
2007 - Heerenveen, 7th
2008 - Berlin, 5th
2009 - Hamar, 4th
2010 - Heerenveen, 7th
2011 - Calgary, 8th
European Championships
2007 - Collalbo, 10th
2008 - Kolomna,  4th
2009 - Heerenveen,  3rd
2010 - Hamar,  6th
2011 - Collalbo,  4th
National Allround Championships
2007 - Heerenveen, 5th
2008 - Groningen, 
2009 - Heerenveen, 
2010 - Heerenveen, 
2011 - Heerenveen, 
World Junior Allround Championships
2005 - Seinäjoki,  2nd
2006 - Erfurt,  2nd
European Junior Games
2005 - Moscow,  3rd at 1500 m
2005 - Moscow,  1st at 5000 m
2006 - Collalbo,  1st at 1500 m
2006 - Collalbo,  3rd at 5000 m
World Single Distance Championships
2008 - Nagano,  3rd at 5000 m
2008 - Nagano,  1st at team pursuit
2009 - Vancouver,  1st at team pursuit
2011 - Inzell, 7th 5000 m

Source: www.sskating.com

References

1986 births
Dutch male speed skaters
People from Losser
Living people
World Single Distances Speed Skating Championships medalists
Sportspeople from Overijssel